Brian Lowe (born 25 June 1939) is a former Australian rules footballer who played in Tasmania and Victoria from the late 1950s until the early 1970s. He was inducted into the Tasmanian Football Hall of Fame in 2005.

Lowe, a ruckman, played with Geelong in the Victorian Football League (VFL) during the early 1960s while Bob Davis was coach and were starting to develop into a strong side. A member of Geelong's 1961 'night premiership' team, Lowe played in the drawn 1962 VFL Preliminary Final against Carlton as well as the narrow loss in the replay the following weekend. Geelong again made the finals again in 1963 but Lowe, despite participating in their Semi Final defeat of Hawthorn Football Club which booked a place in the Grand Final, was not selected in the premiership decider, which they won.

Upon leaving Geelong, Lowe become captain/coach of Tasmanian club Cooee and represented the state, as vice-captain, in the 1966 Hobart Carnival. His original club, City-South, placed him in the back pocket of their official 'Team of the Century'.

References

Holmesby, Russell and Main, Jim (2007). The Encyclopedia of AFL Footballers. 7th ed. Melbourne: Bas Publishing.

1939 births
Living people
Australian rules footballers from Tasmania
Geelong Football Club players
Cooee Football Club players
East Launceston Football Club players
City-South Football Club players
Tasmanian Football Hall of Fame inductees